is a former Japanese football player.

Playing career
Sato was born in Tokyo on 27 June 1978. After graduating from high school, he joined J1 League club Kyoto Purple Sanga in 1997. However he could not play at all in the match until 1998. In 1999, he moved to newly was promoted to J2 League club, Sagan Tosu with Ryo Fukudome. He became a regular player as center back and played many matches for the club for a long time. In 2005, he moved to Japan Football League club ALO's Hokuriku. He retired end of 2006 season.

Club statistics

References

External links

1978 births
Living people
Association football people from Tokyo
Japanese footballers
J1 League players
J2 League players
Japan Football League players
Kyoto Sanga FC players
Sagan Tosu players
Kataller Toyama players
Association football defenders